The Cataraqui Region Conservation Authority is one of 36  conservation authorities in the Canadian province of Ontario. It is headquartered in Kingston, Ontario The  authority was established by an Order in Council in December 1964 via the Conservation Authorities Act, and is a member authority of Conservation Ontario.

The authority is responsible for the management and protection of 11 watersheds in 11 municipalities, the most prominent watersheds being those for the Cataraqui River and Gananoque River. It spans an area from the Bay of Quinte in the west to Brockville in the east.

Conservation areas
Cataraqui Region Conservation Authority manages seven conservation areas:

Little Cataraqui Creek Conservation Area, Kingston
Lemoine Point Conservation Area, Kingston
Gould Lake Conservation Area, South Frontenac
Lyn Valley Conservation Area, Elizabethtown-Kitley
Mac Johnson Wildlife Area, Brockville and Elizabethtown-Kitley
Marshlands Conservation Area, Kingston
Parrott's Bay Conservation Area, Loyalist

References

External links

Conservation authorities in Ontario
Organizations established in 1964
1964 establishments in Ontario